NGC 18 is a double star system located in the constellation of Pegasus. It was first recorded by Herman Schultz on 15 October 1866. It was looked for but not found by Édouard Stephan on 2 October 1882. It was independently  observed by Guillaume Bigourdan in November 1886.

Both stars are  light-years away, and based on this distance have a minimum separation of approximately 2,700 astronomical units, an unusually wide separation for a binary system.

See also
 Double star
 Binary star
 List of NGC objects (1–999)

References

External links
 

Pegasus (constellation)
Double stars
0018
18661015